Joe Kegans Intermediate Sanctions Facility is an Intermediate Sanctions facility of the Texas Department of Criminal Justice located along the northeast edge of Downtown Houston, Texas.

The detention facility building that Kegans uses first opened in February 1995 as a place to house nonviolent offenders in order to relieve prison overcrowding. The unit closed after four months of use because not enough inmates had been put there to justify the additional expenses. The building had been unoccupied for two years before it re-opened in 1997. The building was formally dedicated at 10 A.M. on Wednesday October 15, 1997. As of 1997 all prisoners at the unit are convicted of parole violations such as non-violent property crimes. The unit was named after Joe Kegans, a state district judge who died in 1997 at 69 years of age.

The Kegans Jail, along with the Pam Lychner State Jail, serves state jail offenders from Harris County. As of 2001 Kegans serves lower risk offenders.

References

External links

 "Kegans Unit." Texas Department of Criminal Justice.

Prisons in Texas
Buildings and structures in Houston
1995 establishments in Texas
Downtown Houston